In 2012, the Australian radio station ABC Classic FM held a Classic 100 Music of France countdown.

The selection of works that were available in the survey was determined between 14 July 2012 and 17 August 2012 (with the public being able to add works to the list initiated by the station). Voting (by the public) for the finalised list of works was held between 22 August 2012 and 14 September 2012. Each voter could select up to five works from the list of available pieces.

On 30 September Pinchgut Opera held a special concert "Music of France" at the Old Courts at the Art Gallery of New South Wales to celebrate the countdown, along with a private viewing of the exhibition Eugène Atget: Old Paris. The concert was broadcast on ABC Classic FM and via the Internet on 3 October 2012.

The broadcast of the countdown commenced on 8 October 2012 and continued until 14 October 2012.

Countdown results
The results of countdown are as follows:

Programming
For more information about the works broadcast (including performers and recording details), see ABC Classic FM's programming notes:
Day 1: Numbers 100 to 84
Day 2: Numbers 83 to 69
Day 3: Numbers 68 to 54
Day 4: Numbers 53 to 43
Day 5: Numbers 42 to 29
Day 6: Numbers 28 to 10
Day 7: Numbers 9 to 1

By composer
The following 34 composers featured in the countdown:

See also
 Classic 100 Countdowns
 List of French classical composers (chronological)

Notes

References

External links

Classic 100 – The Music of France – The Top Ten and Selected Highlights – ABC Shop Online pre-order

Classic 100 Countdowns (ABC)
Classical music in France
2012 in Australian music